Orellana de la Sierra is a municipality in the province of Badajoz, Extremadura, Spain. It has a population of 243 and an area of 16.7 km².

References

Municipalities in the Province of Badajoz